The following lists events that happened during 1988 in New Zealand.

Population
 Estimated population as of 31 December: 3,345,200
 Increase since 31 December 1987: 3,100 (0.09%)
 Males per 100 Females: 97.3

Incumbents

Regal and viceregal
 Head of State – Elizabeth II
 Governor-General – The Rt Revd. Sir Paul Reeves GCMG GCVO QSO

Government
The 42nd New Zealand Parliament continued. The fourth Labour Party government was in power.
 Speaker of the House – Kerry Burke
 Prime Minister – David Lange
 Deputy Prime Minister – Geoffrey Palmer
 Minister of Finance – Roger Douglas until 14 December, then David Caygill
 Minister of Foreign Affairs – Russell Marshall
 Chief Justice — Sir Ronald Davison

Parliamentary opposition 
 Leader of the Opposition – Jim Bolger (National).

Main centre leaders
 Mayor of Auckland – Catherine Tizard
 Mayor of Hamilton – Ross Jansen
 Mayor of Wellington – Jim Belich
 Mayor of Christchurch – Hamish Hay
 Mayor of Dunedin – Cliff Skeggs

Events 
 The number of unemployed reaches 100,000.
 The Federation of Labour and Combined State Unions merge to form the Council of Trade Unions.
 New Zealand Post closed 432 post offices.
 Fisheries quota package announced for Mäori iwi.
 The Hokitika Guardian and Star ceases publication.
 6 February: Waitangi Day celebrations at Waitangi are suspended.
 7 March: Cyclone Bola strikes the East Coast of the North Island
 30 March: The State Sector Act is passed to reform the Public Service.
 April: The Royal Commission on Social Policy issues its report.
 5 April: Gibbs Report ("Unshackling the Hospitals") released.
 May: Picot Report on educational administration released.
 June: The electrification of the North Island Main Trunk railway between Hamilton and Palmerston North is completed.
 1 July: The Government announces the return of Bastion Point to its Ngāti Whātua owners.
 1 July: Commercial TV goes 7 days a week, except Good Friday, Easter Sunday, and Christmas Day.

Arts and literature
 John Dickson wins the Robert Burns Fellowship.

See 1988 in art, 1988 in literature, :Category:1988 books

Music

New Zealand Music Awards
Winners are shown first with nominees underneath.
 ALBUM OF THE YEAR Dave Dobbyn – Loyal
Shona Laing – South
The Warratahs – Only game in Town
 SINGLE OF THE YEAR Holidaymakers–Sweet Lovers
Dave Dobyyn – Love You Like I Should
Tex Pistol / Rikki Morris – Nobody Else
 BEST MALE VOCALIST Dave Dobbyn
Herbs
Barry Saunders
 BEST FEMALE VOCALIST Shona Laing
Aishah
Annie Crummer
 BEST GROUP Herbs
The Chills
The Warratahs
 MOST PROMISING MALE VOCALIST Peter Marshall
Rikki Morris
Thom Nepia
 MOST PROMISING FEMALE VOCALIST Mara Finau
Tracey Birnie
Helen Mulholland
 MOST PROMISING GROUP Holidaymakers
Straightjacket Fits
The Tunnellers
 INTERNATIONAL ACHIEVEMENT Neil Finn
The Chills
Shona Laing
 BEST VIDEO Fane Flaws – Sweet Lovers (Holidaymakers)
Janine Morell – Haere Mai
Paul Middleditch – Nobody Else
 BEST FILM SOUNDTRACK Dalvanius Prime / Dave Hurley – Poi E
Dalvanius / Ginane / Smith – Ngati
 BEST PRODUCER Nigel Stone–Holidaymakers (Holidaymakers)
Tex Pistol – Nobody Else
Stephen McCurdy/ Shona Laing/ Graeme Myhre – South
 BEST ENGINEER Nigel Stone–Holidaymakers (Holidaymakers)
Rhys Moody – Brazier'
Rhys Moody/ Doug Rogers – Sensation
 BEST JAZZ ALBUM Beaver – Live at Ronnie Scott's
Frank Gibsons Jazz Mobile – Spreading The Word
Sustenance – Sustenance 3
 BEST CLASSICAL ALBUM NZ Symphony Orchestra – Prodigal Country
NZ Symphony Orchestra – War and Peace/ Jack Winters Dream
 BEST FOLK ALBUM Mike Harding – From The Edge
Wayne Gillespie – Hearts For
David Hollis – With Love
 BEST COUNTRY ALBUM The Warratahs – Only Game in Town
Patsy Riggir – The Best OF (Plus Four)
Al Hunter – Jealous Guy
 BEST GOSPEL ALBUM Derek Lind – Strange Logic
Barry McGuire – Sailing Free
Stephen Bell Booth – Timeless
 BEST POLYNESIAN ALBUM Pātea Māori Club – Poi E
Kahurangi – Magically Maori
Dalvanius Prime/ Patea Maori/ Moana/ Dave Dobbyn Guinney/ Kara Pewhairangi – Ngoi Ngoi 
 BEST SONGWRITER Rikki Morris – Nobody Else
Hona/ Lundon/ Cassells – Listen
Dave Dobbyn – Love You Like I Should
 BEST COVER Lesley Maclean – Pagan in a Pagan Land
John Collie – Bird Dog
Susan Pryor – You Don't Need Me

See: 1988 in music

Performing arts

 Benny Award presented by the Variety Artists Club of New Zealand to Alma Woods MBE and Ricky May.

Radio and television
 1 December: The Broadcasting Corporation of New Zealand is split into Radio New Zealand and Television New Zealand. The Avalon studio becomes a separate subsidiary of TVNZ.  

See: 1988 in New Zealand television, 1988 in television, List of TVNZ television programming, :Category:Television in New Zealand, TV3 (New Zealand), :Category:New Zealand television shows, Public broadcasting in New Zealand

Film
 Illustrious Energy
 Mauri
 Send a Gorilla
 The Grasscutter
 The Navigator: A Mediaeval Odyssey

See: :Category:1988 film awards, 1988 in film, List of New Zealand feature films, Cinema of New Zealand, :Category:1988 films

Internet
See: NZ Internet History

Sport

Athletics
 Paul Ballinger wins his third national title in the men's marathon, clocking 2:16:05 on 30 April in Rotorua, while Jillian Costley claims her second in the women's championship (2:39:20).

Horse racing

Harness racing
 New Zealand Trotting Cup: Luxury Liner
 Auckland Trotting Cup: Luxury Liner – 2nd win

Olympic Games

Summer Olympics

 New Zealand sends a team of 83 competitors in 16 sports.

Winter Olympics

 New Zealand sends a team of nine competitors across three sports.

Paralympic Games

Summer Paralympics

Winter Paralympics

 New Zealand sends a team of three competitors in one sport.

Rugby

League

17 July – The 1988 Great Britain Lions tour concludes with New Zealand defeating Great Britain in a Test match at Addington Showground, Christchurch before a crowd of 8,525.
9 October – In the 1988 Rugby League World Cup Final Australia defeats New Zealand at Eden Park, Auckland before a crowd of 47,363.

Union

Shooting
Ballinger Belt – John Whiteman (Upper Hutt)

Soccer
 The Chatham Cup is won by Waikato United who beat Christchurch United on the basis of away goals (2-2 and 1–1 in a two-leg final).

Births

January
 2 January – Joseph Paulo, rugby league player
 3 January – Steven Kent, swimmer
 4 January – Peter Saili, rugby union player
 6 January – Esther Lanser, cricketer
 11 January – Andre Taylor, rugby union player
 12 January – Ben Afeaki, rugby union player
 15 January – Riki Hoeata, rugby union player
 17 January – Kade Poki, rugby union player
 18 January – Andrew Wheeler, basketball player
 20 January – Rushlee Buchanan, cyclist
 23 January – Shaun Kenny-Dowall, rugby league player

February
 1 February – Katie Duncan, association footballer
 2 February – Kieron Fonotia, rugby union player
 3 February – Daniel O'Regan, rugby league player
 7 February – Mataupu Poching, rugby league player
 8 February
 Graham Oberlin-Brown, rower
 13 February – Eddy Pettybourne, rugby league player
 15 February
 Sam Anderson-Heather, rugby union player
 Claire Garrood, cricketer
 16 February
 James Baker, cricketer
 Sarah Murphy, biathlete
 20 February – Troy Garton, boxer
 23 February – Ashley Cooper, singer
 24 February
 Levi Hanssen, association footballer
 Emma Hayman, tennis player
 25 February – Lagi Setu, rugby league and rugby union player

March
 6 March
 Marina Erakovic, tennis player
 Frank Halai, rugby union player
 8 March – Hannah Broederlow, netball player
 9 March – Ash Moeke, rugby union player
 10 March – Josh Hoffman, rugby league player
 17 March – Patrick Ah Van, rugby league player
 18 March – Grace Rasmussen, netball player
 20 March – Sonny Fai, rugby league player
 21 March – Anthony Cherrington, rugby league player
 23 March – Suaia Matagi, rugby league player
 24 March – Matt Todd, rugby union player
 30 March – Petrea Webster, field hockey player
 31 March – Curtis McGrath, canoeist

April
 5 April – Quade Cooper, rugby union player
 14 April
 Francis Mossman, actor
 Dan Pryor, rugby union player
 16 April – Simon Child, field hockey player
 18 April
 Sam Belkin, amateur wrestler
 Erin Bermingham, cricketer
 21 April – Niall Williams, rugby union and touch player
 24 April – Junior Tia-Kilifi, rugby league player
 25 April – Liam Foran, rugby league player

May
 3 May – Brent Renouf, Australian rules footballer
 4 May – Westley Gough, cyclist
 5 May
 Jaimee Lovett, canoeist
 Ant Pedersen, motor racing driver
 6 May
 Evie, professional wrestler
 Rhys Phillips, cricketer
 11 May – Stephen Paea, American football player
 13 May – Trent Renata, rugby union player
 16 May
 Marty Kain, cricketer
 Daniel Quigley, rowing coxswain
 17 May – Scott Curry, rugby union player
 20 May – Nikki Hamblin, athlete
 29 May – Tom Furniss, comedian
 30 May – Antonio Winterstein, rugby league player

June
 1 June – Natalie Rooney, sports shooter
 6 June – Israel Dagg, rugby union player
 8 June – Charlotte Kight, netball player
 19 June – Grayson Hart, rugby union player
 23 June – Nick McLennan, rugby union player
 24 June – Ryan Sissons, triathlete
 25 June – Eliana Rubashkyn, transgender refugee
 28 June – Alana Millington, field hockey player

July
 1 July – Kendra Cocksedge, cricketer and rugby union player
 3 July
 Cole Peverley, association footballer
 Winston Reid, association footballer
 6 July
 Andrew de Boorder, cricketer
 Jesse Sergent, cyclist
 7 July – Katie Perkins, cricketer
 8 July – Mike Harris, rugby union player
 10 July – Sarah Walker, BMX rider
 11 July – Paula Griffin, netball player
 13 July – Robbie Fruean, rugby union player
 16 July – Lyndon Sheehan, freestyle skier
 18 July – Andrew Horrell, rugby union player
 20 July – B. J. Anthony, basketball player
 21 July – Julian Matthews, athlete
 26 July
 Derek Carpenter, rugby union player
 Tetera Faulkner, rugby union player
 27 July – John Hardie, rugby union player
 31 July
 Alex Glenn, rugby league player
 Brackin Karauria-Henry, rugby union player

August
 1 August
 Tim Perry, rugby union player
 Bodene Thompson, rugby league player
 6 August – Kayla McAlister, netball and rugby union player
 8 August – Brad Cachopa, cricketer
 12 August – Suliasi Taufalele, rugby union player
 14 August – Dave Thomas, rugby union player
 15 August – Nasi Manu, rugby union player
 18 August – Michael Boxall, association footballer
 22 August – Sarah Major, actor
 24 August
 Cathryn Finlayson, field hockey player
 Manu Maʻu, rugby league player
 28 August – Kane Hames, rugby union player
 29 August
 Fritz Lee, rugby union player
 Lewis Marshall, rugby union player

September
 1 September – Ash Dixon, rugby union player
 4 September – David Eade, rower
 5 September – Jackson Willison, rugby union player
 7 September – Tevita Koloamatangi, rugby union player
 14 September
 Callum Gibbins, rugby union player
 Sean Maitland, rugby union player
 16 September – Nathaniel Neale, rugby league player
 17 September – Michael Fitzgerald, association footballer
 18 September – Joe Moody, rugby union player
 19 September – Rebecca Spence, triathlete
 22 September – Jeet Raval, cricketer
 23 September
 Hayley Crofts, netball player
 Ryan Crotty, rugby union player
 25 September
 Quentin MacDonald, rugby union player
 Josh Rowland, rugby union player
 30 September – Joelle King, squash player

October
 3 October – Helen Collins, association footballer
 4 October – Mitchey Greig, freestyle skier
 5 October – Luke Braid, rugby union player
 7 October
 Kurt Baker, rugby union player
 Michael Leitch, rugby union player
 10 October – Rose McIver, actor
 12 October – Sam Whitelock, rugby union player
 14 October – Terefe Ejigu, athlete
 16 October
 Fiona Bourke, rower
 Karl Filiga, rugby league player
 18 October – Luuka Jones, slalom canoeist
 19 October – Naturalism, Thoroughbred racehorse
 27 October – Rodney Ah You, rugby union player
 29 October
 Roman Van Uden, cyclist
 Kayne Vincent, association footballer

November
 1 November
 Nick Barrett, rugby union player
 Hamish Carson, athlete
 4 November – Paea Faʻanunu, rugby union player
 8 November – Shaun Teasdale, archer
 10 November
 Lord Gyllene, Thoroughbred racehorse
 Jeremy Su'a, rugby union player
 14 November – Mitchell Crosswell, rugby union player
 18 November – Lucy Oliver, athlete
 20 November – Vicky Rodewyk, actor, model and dancer
 21 November – Aaron Smith, rugby union player
 22 November – Tu'u Maori, rugby league player
 23 November – Tony Goodin, cricketer
 25 November – Mat Luamanu, rugby union player
 28 November
 Daniel Kirkpatrick, rugby union player
 Nic Mayhew, rugby union player
 Christy Prior, snowboarder
 29 November – Corey Webster, basketball player
 30 November – Edward Purcell, rugby league player

December
 1 December – Taione Vea, rugby union player
 7 December – James Marshall, rugby union player
 8 December – Simon van Velthooven, cyclist
 11 December – Tim Southee, cricketer
 12 December – Isaac John, rugby league player
 13 December – James Tamou, rugby league player
 16 December – Robin Cheong, taekwando competitor
 17 December – Steve Rapira, rugby league player

Exact date unknown
 Eli Kent, playwright and actor
 Sam McCarthy, songwriter and musician

Deaths

January–February
 2 January – Bill Crawford-Compton, World War II air ace, air force commander (born 1915)
 10 January – Ron King, rugby union player and selector (born 1909)
 11 January – Arthur Collins, rugby union player (born 1906)
 9 February – Zelma Roberts, writer (born 1915)
 17 February – Reginald Uren, architect (born 1906)
 23 February – Charlie Jackman, cricketer (born 1906)
 29 February – Sister Mary Gabriel, nun, pharmacist (born 1904)

March–April
 16 March – Harold Turbott, medical practitioner, public health administrator, broadcaster and writer (born 1899)
 23 March – Cyril Walter, cricketer, field hockey player and coach, sports writer (born 1912)
 30 March – Sir Donald McKay, politician (born 1908)
 7 April – Christopher Rollinson, boxer (born 1928)
 16 April – Doug Mudgway, amateur wrestler (born 1924)
 17 April – Ormond Wilson, politician (born 1907)

May–June
 9 May – Robert Alexander, cricketer (born 1911)
 14 May – Fred Atkins, professional wrestler (born 1910)
 22 May – Leslie Stephen-Smith, cricketer (born 1904)
 24 May – Tom Burtt, cricketer (born 1915)
 26 May – Neta Neale, theatre director, speech and drama teacher (born 1904)
 27 May – Alwyn Warren, Anglican bishop, university chancellor (born 1900)
 28 May – Evelyn Page, artist (born 1899)
 1 June – Ricky May, musician (born 1943)
 3 June – Christabel Robinson, vocational guidance and community worker (born 1898)
 4 June – Elizabeth Turnbull, woollen mill worker (born 1885)
 5 June – Brian Ashby, Roman Catholic bishop (born 1923)
 17 June – Cyril Crawford, cricketer (born 1902)
 24 June
 Alexander Astor, rabbi, community leader (born 1900)
 Anthony Rohrs, cricketer (born 1961)
 25 June – Neville Pickering, politician, mayor of Christchurch (1971–74) (born 1923)
 30 June – Hubert Ryburn, university administrator (born 1897)

July–August
 8 July – Enga Washbourn, artist and writer (born 1908)
 12 July – Robert Monteith, cricket umpire (born 1937)
 18 July – Ralph Bulmer, ethnobiologist (born 1928)
 21 July – Dame Cecily Pickerill, plastic surgeon (born 1903)
 24 July – May Smith, painter, engraver, textile designer (born 1906)
 1 August – G. S. Carter, surveyor and road engineer (born 1910)
 4 August – Brian Brake, photographer (born 1927)
 5 August – Nora Sipos, humanitarian and welfare worker (born 1900)
 28 August – Paul Whitelaw, cricketer (born 1910)
 30 August – Sir Jack Marshall, politician, 28th Prime Minister of New Zealand (born 1912)
 31 August – Ivan Tomašević, political activist (born 1897)

September–October
 4 September – Rona Stevenson, politician (born 1911)
 6 September – Mary Martin, netball player (born 1915)
 11 September – Bernard Holman, artist (born 1941)
 13 September – Ron Rangi, rugby union player (born 1941)
 17 September – Jim Watt, rugby union player, paediatrics academic (born 1914)
 9 October – Bob Goslin, boxer (born 1927)
 31 October – Gwen Somerset, teacher, adult education director, educationalist, writer (born 1894)

November–December
 1 November – Louis Johnson, poet (born 1924)
 4 November – Saul Goldsmith, political candidate (born 1911)
 7 November
 Aubrey Begg, politician (born 1929)
 Sir Douglas Carter, politician (born 1908)
 12 November – Pat Perrin, potter (born 1921)
 28 November – Robert Stewart, sailor (born 1906)
 29 November – Thomas Lemin, cricketer (born 1905)
 5 December – Monica McKenzie, dietitian (born 1905)
 8 December
 Airini Grennell, singer, pianist, broadcaster (born 1910)
 Sir Andrew McKee, air force leader (born 1902)
 10 December – Beau Cottrell, rugby union player, Rotarian (born 1907)
 16 December – John Cameron, cricketer (born 1898)
 21 December
 Bruce Ferguson, army officer (born 1917)
 Charlie Peek, child welfare administrator, billiards player (born 1904)
 27 December – William Fea, rugby union and squash player (born 1898)

See also
 List of years in New Zealand
 Timeline of New Zealand history
 History of New Zealand
 Military history of New Zealand
 Timeline of the New Zealand environment
 Timeline of New Zealand's links with Antarctica

References

External links

 
New Zealand
Years of the 20th century in New Zealand